"Marco Polo" is a single released by Bow Wow for his album New Jack City II, but ended up not making the album because Bow Wow had a feud with Soulja Boy Tellem, but was available as a Wal-Mart Deluxe Edition bonus track. The song was produced by Soulja Boy Tellem.

The album version of the song does not contain any explicit lyrics by Bow Wow. An earlier version leaked onto the internet that had a completely different first verse by Bow Wow that did however contain explicit lyrics. Soulja Boy Tellem's verse on both versions is the same except it is edited to not have the 2 explicit words at the end of his verse for the album version.            Soulja Boy's line, "Gucci Bandanna" is sampled as the hook of his song, "Gucci Bandanna" from his second album, iSouljaBoyTellEm.

Music video
The video begins with Bow Wow and Soulja Boy picking up trash near a pool with their boss, a lifeguard (portrayed by comedian Doo Doo Brown) giving them a hard time. They then proceed to call up some friends, and have a party by the pool doing the "Marco Polo" dance which is similar to Peekaboo.

Canceled remix
Bow Wow announced a remix, that would feature T-Pain, Lil Wayne, Twista, Busta Rhymes and upcoming Australian rapper Yung Zimmie via his "Say Now" The remix never was released. So Bow Wow featured V.I.C. & Soulja Boy Tell 'Em for the official remix.

Charts

References

2008 singles
2008 songs
Bow Wow (rapper) songs
Soulja Boy songs
Columbia Records singles
Songs written by Soulja Boy
Songs written by Bow Wow (rapper)